Mean Tricks (original name: Hornsby e Rodriguez - Sfida criminale) is a 1992 crime thriller film produced in Italy and directed by Umberto Lenzi. Released in 1992, it starred Charles Napier, David Warbeck and Stefano Sabelli. It was shot between Kinepolis Studios in Rome, Santo Domingo and Miami.

Plot 
Hornsby, a recently retired FBI agent (Charles Napier) goes to South America to find his old partner because rumor has it that his old partner has become a criminal.  When the former partner is killed, Hornsby alters the crime scene to make it appear that his ex-partner killed the gunman himself. The rest of the movie follows Hornsby as he tries to discover who killed his partner and why.

Cast
 Charles Napier as Brian Hornsby 
 Stefano Sabelli as Rodriguez 
 Iris Peynado as Candelaria
 David Brandon as Jimmy Gandelman / Cobra 
 David Warbeck as Frank Mendoza 
 Bettina Giovannini  
 Stelio Candelli
 Salvatore Lago 
 Italo Clemente  
 Marco Felicioli 
 Enzo Frattari
 Marco Onorato 
 Riccardo Petrazzi 
 Elena Wiedermann 
 Roberto Ricci  
 Marcello Tallone
 Emy Valentino
 Doris Susanna Vonthury

References

External links
 

1992 films
Italian crime thriller films
1992 crime thriller films
1990s Italian-language films
English-language Italian films
Films directed by Umberto Lenzi
Films scored by Franco Micalizzi
1990s Italian films
1992 multilingual films
Italian multilingual films